Mike Newkirk (born August 12, 1986) is a former professional American and Canadian football Defensive End / Defensive Tackle.  Newkirk also played DE/LB for the Chicago Rush of the Arena Football League. He was signed by the St. Louis Rams as an undrafted free agent in 2009. He played college football for the Wisconsin Badgers.

Newkirk has also been a member of the Edmonton Eskimos of the Canadian Football team.

Mike has 1 OWI in the State of WI stemming from a 2017 incident. 
Rock County Case Number 2017TR014993 Rock, County of vs. Michael Jeffery Newkirk

College career
Newkirk was part of the defensive line rotation in both 2005 and 2006. He became a starter in 2007 as a defensive end and the following season, 2008, he was moved to defensive tackle and he was voted Second-team All-Big Ten coming up with four sacks and nine tackles for loss. He ended his career with 10 sacks and 208 tackles, with 29 of those going for a loss.

Pre-draft measurables

St. Louis Rams
On April 27, 2009, he was signed as an undrafted free agent by the St. Louis Rams. Newkirk was waived by the Rams on May 14, 2009.

Edmonton Eskimos
Newkirk was signed to the Edmonton Eskimos practice roster on July 12, 2009. He was released on September 1.

Chicago Rush
Newkirk was assigned to the Chicago Rush on April 5, 2010.  He later left the team.

References

1986 births
Living people
People from Ladysmith, Wisconsin
American football defensive ends
Canadian football defensive linemen
American players of Canadian football
Wisconsin Badgers football players
St. Louis Rams players
Edmonton Elks players